The Two Sergeants is a 1936 Italian historical film directed by Enrico Guazzoni and starring Evi Maltagliati, Gino Cervi and Mino Doro. It was based on the play The Two Sergeants by Theodore d'Aubigny, which has been made into films several times. It is set in the Napoleonic Wars. The film marked the debut of Alida Valli who had until recently been a student of the Centro sperimentale di cinematografia. Valli went on to be a leading star of Italian cinema.

The film was shot at the Pisorno Studios in Tirrenia and on location in Tuscany. The sets were designed by Virgilio Marchi, a noted architect who worked for many years in the film industry.

Main cast
 Evi Maltagliati as Marilyne Gould  
 Gino Cervi as  Federico Martelli/ Guglielmo Salvoni  
 Mino Doro as  Roberto Magni  
 Luisa Ferida as Lauretta Fracassa  
 Ugo Ceseri as  Fracassa  
 Antonio Centa as  Carlo Duval/ Georges Masson  
 Nella Maria Bonora as Anna Martelli  
 Lamberto Picasso as Lacroix  
 Vera Dani as Pia Martelli  
 Margherita Bagni as Luisa  
 Enzo Biliotti as Howe  
 Tatiana Pavoni as Madame Jeannette 
 Matilde Casagrande as  'Au Bon Marché' 
 Ivana Diani as  'Au Bon Marché'  
 Titti Leinmüller as  'Au Bon Marché'  
 Giuliana Gianni as  'Au Bon Marché'  
 Jole Tinta as  'Au Bon Marché'  
 Alida Valli as  'Au Bon Marché' 
 Valentino Bruchi as Gravel 
 Emilio Petacci as 
 Nicola Maldacea as 
 Giovanna Scotto as 
 Umberto Casilini as Ferroni, 
 Nico Pepe as

References

External links 

1936 films
Italian historical drama films
1930s historical drama films
1930s Italian-language films
Films directed by Enrico Guazzoni
Films set in the 19th century
Films shot at Tirrenia Studios
Italian black-and-white films
1936 drama films
Films scored by Alessandro Cicognini
1930s Italian films